Growing Up was a Philippine teen drama series aired on ABS-CBN from September 4, 2011, to February 12, 2012, replacing Good Vibes. It is top billed by Mara Clara stars Kathryn Bernardo, Julia Montes, Diego Loyzaga, Kiray Celis and EJ Jallorina with other teen casts Daniel Padilla of Gimik 2010, Neil Coleta of 100 Days to Heaven, and Yen Santos of Good Vibes.

The series is streaming online on YouTube.

Synopsis 
Ella (Kathryn Bernardo) and Tammy (Julia Montes) are childhood best friends who belong to a set of friends that treat each other as family. As such, they have a mother figure in the person of their favorite teacher, Lisa Ortega (Maricar Reyes), who guides their path in their fragile journey as teenagers. When Ms. Ortega is diagnosed with cancer, Ella and Tammy rally their friends to raise funds for their beloved teacher's expensive medical treatment. They join various contests in a big event in their community, aiming to seize the biggest prizes. But doing so proves to be no easy task, as each of them discover their respective strengths and weaknesses that challenge the way they think, dream, and love, and in so doing become obstacles to their objective. In the end, they manage to reap the reward they worked for, only to find out that it is better than they hoped for.

Cast and characters

Main cast
 Kathryn Bernardo as Mikaella "Ella" Dimalanta – A 15-year-old middle class student of a modest private school in San Martin, Zambales. She lives with a single mother whom she encourages to stay single to avoid suffering another heartbreak. Her mom's experiences has made her distrustful of men, but her belief is tested when she falls in love with Patrick Rivero, a show-off and rude classmate.
 Julia Montes as Samantha "Tammy" Magtoto – A sweet and hopelessly romantic girl, she is Ella's best friend and classmate in San Martin. They became closer since Tammy's single father is working overseas, entrusting his daughter to Ella's watch. Unlike Ella, Tammy wears her heart on her sleeves, and eventually experiences heartbreak over a young man, Jason Rivero, who has unfinished business with another girl.
 Daniel Padilla as Peter Romnick "Patrick" Rivero – The younger brother of Jason. He really gets upset when he is always compared by his father to his older brother Jason. He is picking on Ella that made her always mad at him and sometimes say unkind words to him. But truthfully, he likes Ella from the very start ever since he switched schools. He joined their group because of her. Patrick is also kind and caring especially when it comes to his friends and Ella.
 Neil Coleta as Christian Mico "Tikoy" Navarro – A repeater who attends the same school as Ella, Tammy and Patrick. He has lived in the house of his stern aunt after his single mom went abroad and seemed to have abandoned him. He may look jolly and funny, but deep inside he is yearning for love. He soon finds one, Cassie, but at the expense of discovering an ugly truth.
Kiray Celis as Brigette Honey "Britney" Gunay – Schoolmate of Ella, Tammy, Patrick and Tikoy. Her parents are lower-class workers and she has many younger siblings. She may have a homely face, but among Ella and Tammy, she is the only one with a boyfriend. Funny, loyal, and frank, she soon finds out something about her boyfriend that will challenge the way she loves.
 EJ Jallorina as William Kingston "Winston" del Rosario – Schoolmate of Ella and company. He loves the arts and often taunted as a geek. He has a long-time relationship with Britney, an experience that eventually leads him to confront his identity after being endeared to another person.
Diego Loyzaga as Ejay Edison "Jason" Rivero – Patrick's older brother.
 Yen Santos as Cassandra "Cassie" Montenegro – Cassie is a cloistered daughter who has a transparent relationship with her parents. She is highly idealistic about the concept of love and finding the right man. When she does realize that her long-time suitor, Jason Rivero, is the one for her, she pursues him, but finds out that some things will not follow the way she wants them to be.

Supporting cast 
 Maricar Reyes as Lisa Ortega – Ms. Ortega is the adviser of the group and coach of the San Martin Sun Spikers Volleyball team. She is the one training them and acts like an elder sister or second mother to the group. The group realizes that she has breast cancer and looks for a way to help her.
 Ron Morales as James Reyes
 Angel Jacob as Isabelle Dimalanta
 Jeffrey Santos as Henry
 Jenny Miller as Stella
 Gerald Madrid as John
 Tess Antonio as Mrs. Gunay
 Roden Araneta as Mr. Gunay
 Jong Cuenco as Mr. del Rosario
 Piero Vergara as Richard
 Tippy Dos Santos as Michelle
 Jovit Baldivino as Brando

Special participation 

 Coco Martin as Asiong

Reception 
The show premieres strongly taking over the number 2 spot with a 12.3% behind ASAP Rocks' 12.7% and beating its rival youth program Tween Hearts.

See also 
List of programs broadcast by ABS-CBN
Growing Up (1997 Philippine TV series)
List of programs aired by Jeepney TV

References

External links
 Official Site
 
 

ABS-CBN drama series
Philippine teen drama television series
Television series by Dreamscape Entertainment Television
2011 Philippine television series debuts
2012 Philippine television series endings
Philippine anthology television series
Filipino-language television shows
Television series about teenagers
Television shows set in Manila